Joyce Manor (sometimes referred to as S/T) is the debut studio album by American punk rock band Joyce Manor, released on January 11, 2011.

Background
Pop-punk band Joyce Manor emerged in the late 2000s from Torrance, California, the pairing of vocalist/guitarist Barry Johnson and guitarist Chase Knobbe. The duo added Matt Ebert on bass and Kurt Walcher in 2009. The band began playing with local group Summer Vacation, which aided in a gravitation towards emo music.

The band signed to 6131 Records, who gave the group a small budget of one thousand dollars to record their first full-length. Johnson, then 24, compiled songs he had composed over various years, including some dating to his teenage years. He viewed the debut as a greatest hits of sorts, a collection of his best work to date. The album was recorded in September 2010 at Earth Capital in Los Angeles with producer Alex Estrada. The group aimed to emulate the sound of Weezer's 1996 album Pinkerton, particularly the spacious way drums were tracked on that LP. Johnson requested Estrada distort his vocal tracks, due to personal pressure: "Maybe I was trying to cover my voice up a little bit because I was insecure," he admitted.

Remix (2021)
For its tenth anniversary, the band issued a remixed iteration of the album, supervised by Estrada. Joyce Manor had felt mixed on the sound quality for some time, as the speed of their songs, in combination with the drum tone, tends to cause details to be lost in the mix. This revised issue removes the drum effects and reduces fazing issues on guitar tracks, among other alterations. Ebert acknowledged that the goal was not to replace the original, but improve the fidelity. Music critic Ian Cohen called the new version "one of the most radical remasters" he had heard.

Reception

Chris DeVille at Stereogum describe the record as "Cali pop-punk crossbred with ripshit lo-fi indie rock, spiked with traces of the Smiths, the Thermals, and especially early Weezer." Danielle Chelosky at Alternative Press referred to it as "beloved," while Jonah Krueger at Consequence dubbed it "iconic." In a retrospective piece for Pitchfork, Ian Cohen called the album legendary, "ten entirely quotable, all-hook songs in 18 minutes." Cohen opined that Joyce Manor, with its brisk and immediate pace, "set the course for its foreseeable future, anticipating a decade of social media and streaming trends that rewarded immediacy and the perpetual bite-sizing of attention spans."

Joyce Manor attracted a cult following, with a leaked copy of generating publicity. The group's rise to fame was aided by fans on the social platform Tumblr, many of which "shar[ed] gifs, lyric quotes, and glitchy live videos" to further the band's message.

Johnson spoke on the album's impact in 2021:

Track listing

Personnel
Joyce Manor
 Barry Johnson - vocals, guitar
 Matt Ebert - bass, vocals
 Chase Knobbe - guitar
 Kurt Walcher - drums

Technical
Alex Estrada – production
Paul Miner – mastering
Scott Arnold – design

References

2011 debut albums
Joyce Manor albums
Asian Man Records albums